Calopteryx is a genus of large damselflies belonging to the family Calopterygidae. The colourful males often have coloured wings whereas the more muted females usually have clear wings although some develop male (androchrome) wing characteristics. In both sexes, there is no pterostigma.

Nomenclature
It was only in 1890, many years after Leach named the genus Calopyteryx, that it was widely recognized that Leach's name was a junior synonym of the Fabrician genus Agrion, established 40 years prior. The controversy surrounding which genus name has nomenclatural priority has never been formally resolved; the ICZN mandates that Fabricius' name has priority, but the majority of the world's odonate researchers maintain the use of Calopteryx.

Species
The genus contains the following species:
Calopteryx aequabilis  – River Jewelwing
Calopteryx amata  – Superb Jewelwing
Calopteryx angustipennis  – Appalachian Jewelwing
Calopteryx balcanica 
Calopteryx coomani 
Calopteryx cornelia 
Calopteryx dimidiata  – Sparkling Jewelwing
Calopteryx exul  – Glittering Demoiselle
Calopteryx haemorrhoidalis  – Copper Demoiselle
Calopteryx hyalina  – Clear-winged Demoiselle
Calopteryx intermedia 
Calopteryx japonica 
Calopteryx laosica 
Calopteryx maculata  – Ebony Jewelwing
Calopteryx melli 
Calopteryx mingrelica 
Calopteryx oberthuri 
Calopteryx orientalis 
Calopteryx samarcandica 
Calopteryx splendens  – Banded Demoiselle, Banded Agrion, Banded Jewelwing 
Calopteryx syriaca  – Syrian Demoiselle
Calopteryx taurica 
Calopteryx transcaspica 
Calopteryx virgo  – Beautiful Demoiselle, Beautiful Jewelwing 
Calopteryx waterstoni 
Calopteryx xanthostoma  – Western Demoiselle

References

Calopterygidae
Zygoptera genera
Taxa named by William Elford Leach
Taxonomy articles created by Polbot